Amt Bad Wilsnack/Weisen is an Amt ("collective municipality") in the district of Prignitz, in Brandenburg, Germany. Its seat is in Bad Wilsnack.

The Amt Bad Wilsnack/Weisen consists of the following municipalities:
Bad Wilsnack
Breese
Legde/Quitzöbel
Rühstädt
Weisen

Demography

References

Bad Wilsnack
Prignitz